Electorates in Australia are geographically defined areas represented by a single elected Member of Parliament. Known officially as divisions at the federal level and electoral districts at the state and territory level, "electorates" are also commonly referred to as seats or constituencies. Electorates are designed so that there is approximately the same amount of voters in electorate.

See also
Divisions of the Australian House of Representatives
Electoral divisions of the Northern Territory
Electoral districts of Western Australia
Australian electoral system
Parliaments of the Australian states and territories
State Electoral District

References

External links
Australian electoral legislation
Features of Australian electoral systems
Federal Electoral Division Profiles & Maps
Definitions of Australian Voting Systems